ASASSN-V J213939.3-702817.4 (also known as ASAS-SN-V J213939.3-702817.4 and J213939.3-702817.4) is a star, previously non-variable, found to be associated with an unusual, deep dimming event that was uncovered by the All Sky Automated Survey for SuperNovae (ASAS-SN) project, and first reported on 4 June 2019 in The Astronomer's Telegram.

On 4 June 2019, the star was reported to have dimmed gradually from g~12.96 at HJD 2458635.78, to g~14.22 at 2458637.95, and, as of 4 June 2019, seems to be returning to its quiescent state of g~13.29 at HJD 2458638.89. According to astronomer Tharindu Jayasinghe, one of the discoverers of the deep dimming event, "[The star has] been quiescent for so long and then suddenly decreased in brightness by a huge amount ... Why that happened, we don't know yet."

See also
 Disrupted planet
 List of stars that have unusual dimming periods

References

External links 
 , a presentation by Tabetha S. Boyajian (2016).
 , a presentation by Issac Arthur (2016).
 , star with unusual light fluctuations (2017).
 , up to 80% dimming (2019).

Astronomical objects discovered in 2019
Indus (constellation)
2019 in science
Unsolved problems in astronomy
Unexplained phenomena
F-type main-sequence stars